A Norrish reaction in organic chemistry is a photochemical reaction taking place with ketones and aldehydes. Such reactions are subdivided into Norrish type I reactions and Norrish type II reactions. The reaction is named after Ronald George Wreyford Norrish. While of limited synthetic utility these reactions are important in the photo-oxidation of polymers such as polyolefins, polyesters, certain polycarbonates and polyketones.

Type I 
The Norrish type I reaction is the photochemical cleavage or homolysis of aldehydes and ketones into two free radical intermediates (α-scission). The carbonyl group accepts a photon and is excited to a photochemical singlet state. Through intersystem crossing the triplet state can be obtained. On cleavage of the α-carbon bond from either state, two radical fragments are obtained. The size and nature of these fragments depends upon the stability of the generated radicals; for instance, the cleavage of 2-butanone largely yields ethyl radicals in favor of less stable methyl radicals.

Several secondary reaction modes are open to these fragments depending on the exact molecular structure. 
 The fragments can simply recombine to the original carbonyl compound, with racemisation at the α-carbon.
 The acyl radical can lose a molecule of carbon monoxide, forming a new carbon radical at the other α-carbon, followed by formation of a new carbon–carbon bond between the radicals. The ultimate effect is simple extraction of the carbonyl unit from the carbon chain. The rate and yield of this product depends upon the bond-dissociation energy of the ketone's α substituents. Typically the more α substituted a ketone is, the more likely the reaction will yield products in this way.
 The abstraction of an α-proton from the carbonyl fragment may form a ketene and an alkane.
 The abstraction of a β-proton from the alkyl fragment may form an aldehyde and an alkene.

The synthetic utility of this reaction type is limited, for instance it often is a side reaction in the Paternò–Büchi reaction. One organic synthesis based on this reaction is that of bicyclohexylidene.

Type II
A Norrish type II reaction is the photochemical intramolecular abstraction of a γ-hydrogen (a hydrogen atom three carbon positions removed from the carbonyl group) by the excited carbonyl compound to produce a 1,4-biradical as a primary photoproduct. Norrish first reported the reaction in 1937.

Secondary reactions that occur are fragmentation (β-scission) to form an alkene and an enol (which will rapidly tautomerise to a carbonyl), or intramolecular recombination of the two radicals to a substituted cyclobutane (the Norrish–Yang reaction).

Scope
The Norrish reaction has been studied in relation to environmental chemistry with respect to the photolysis of the aldehyde heptanal, a prominent compound in Earth's atmosphere. Photolysis of heptanal in conditions resembling atmospheric conditions results in the formation of 1-pentene and acetaldehyde in 62% chemical yield together with cyclic alcohols (cyclobutanols and cyclopentanols) both from a Norrish type II channel and around 10% yield of hexanal from a Norrish type I channel (the initially formed n-hexyl radical attacked by oxygen).

In one study the photolysis of an Acyloin derivative in water in presence of hydrogen tetrachloroaurate (HAuCl4) generated nanogold particles with 10 nanometer diameter. The species believed to responsible for reducing Au3+ to Au0 is the Norrish generated ketyl radical.

Paquette's 1982 synthesis of dodecahedrane involves three separate Norrish-type reactions in its approximately 29-step sequence.

An example of a synthetically useful Norrish type II reaction can be found early in the total synthesis of the biologically active cardenolide ouabagenin by Baran and coworkers. The optimized conditions minimize side reactions, such as the competing Norrish type I pathway, and furnish the desired intermediate in good yield on a multi-gram scale.

See also
Photo-Fries rearrangement - a related reaction of aromatic carbonyls
McLafferty rearrangement - similar to a Type II Norrish reaction. Caused by electron impact ionization rather than light
Carbon monoxide-releasing molecules

References

Free radical reactions
Photochemistry
Name reactions